Grape Island is a  island on the Ohio River in Pleasants County, West Virginia. The bar lies off the West Virginia coast from the communities of Grape Island and Spring Run.

The island was so named after the wild grapevines which once covered the island. Grape Island is forested, predominantly with American sycamores. The island serves as a habitat for great blue heron, wood ducks, cormorants, Canada geese, and migrating loons and tundra swans. Because of its diversity in wildlife, Grape Island is a part of the Ohio River Islands National Wildlife Refuge.

See also 
List of islands of West Virginia

References

River islands of West Virginia
Islands of Pleasants County, West Virginia
Islands of the Ohio River